Rebecca of Sunnybrook Farm is a 1917 American silent comedy-drama film directed by Marshall Neilan based upon the 1903 novel of the same name by Kate Douglas Wiggin. This version is notable for having been adapted by famed female screenwriter Frances Marion. The film was made by the "Mary Pickford Company" and was an acclaimed box office hit. When the play premiered on Broadway in the 1910 theater season the part of Rebecca was played by Edith Taliaferro.

Plot
As described in a film magazine, Rebecca Randall (Pickford) is taken into the home of her aunt Hannah (Eddy), a strict New England woman. Rebecca meets Adam Ladd (O'Brien), a young man of the village, and they become great friends. One day Rebecca promises to marry Adam when she becomes of age. Unable to withstand her pranks any longer, her aunt sends her away to a boarding school. She graduates a beautiful young lady. Shortly thereafter, Adam demands a fulfillment of her promise.

Cast

Production
Rebecca of Sunnybrook Farm was filmed in Pleasanton, California.

Reception
Like many American films of the time, Rebecca of Sunnybrook Farm was subject to cuts by city and state film censorship boards. The Chicago Board of Censors required a cut of the intertitle "I have just learned the Simpsons are not married."

See also
 Rebecca of Sunnybrook Farm, 1909 play
 Rebecca of Sunnybrook Farm, 1932 film
 Rebecca of Sunnybrook Farm, 1938 film starring Shirley Temple

References

External links

 
 
 
 
 Rebecca of Sunnybrook Farm available for free download from the Internet Archive

1917 films
1917 comedy-drama films
1910s English-language films
American silent feature films
American black-and-white films
Films based on children's books
Films shot in California
Articles containing video clips
Films with screenplays by Frances Marion
Films based on works by Kate Douglas Wiggin
Censored films
Films directed by Marshall Neilan
1910s American films
Silent American comedy-drama films